Mikhaylovka is a rural locality in Bolsheannenkovsky Selsoviet Rural Settlement, Fatezhsky District, Kursk Oblast, Russia. The population as of 2010 is 74.

References

Notes

Sources

Rural localities in Fatezhsky District